Afraflacilla refulgens is a species of jumping spider in the genus Afraflacilla that lives in Zimbabwe. It was first described in 2008. The species was initially placed in the genus Pseudicius but was transferred in 2017.

References

Salticidae
Endemic fauna of Zimbabwe
Spiders of Africa
Spiders described in 2008
Taxa named by Wanda Wesołowska